Kate Rogal (born November 2, 1983) is an American actress. Best known for appearing on The Sopranos, Law & Order, Law & Order: Criminal Intent, Law & Order: Special Victims Unit, Psych, and Blue Bloods.

Early life
Rogal is the daughter of actress Lori Cardille who starred in George A. Romero's Day of the Dead (1985). She graduated with a BFA from the Carnegie Mellon School of Drama in 2006, and apprenticed with the United Stuntman's Association.

Career
Rogal has performed mostly in supporting roles, her most notable roles are Kate Favor on Psych, Jez in Gravy, and Gretchen in Concussion. In theater Rogal starred in the off-Broadway play Muckrakers.

Rogal is an artist, working mostly with beads and other textile mediums.

Personal life
Rogal married actor Dana Ashbrook in 2015.

Filmography

Film

Television

References

External links

American film actresses
Living people
Carnegie Mellon University College of Fine Arts alumni
Place of birth missing (living people)
1986 births